Polyrhaphis spinipennis is a species of beetle in the family Cerambycidae. It was described by Laporte in 1840. It is known from South America.

References

Polyrhaphidini
Beetles described in 1840